{{Infobox writer
| name = Natalia Ginzburg
| embed =
| honorific_prefix = 
| honorific_suffix = 
| image = Sandro Pertini e Natalia Ginzburg.jpg
| image_size = 230
| alt = 
| caption = Natalia Ginzburg and President Sandro Pertini, early 1980s
| native_name = 
| native_name_lang = 
| pseudonym = Alessandra Tornimparte
| birth_name = Natalia Levi
| birth_date = 
| birth_place = Palermo, Italy
| death_date = 
| death_place = Rome, Italy
| resting_place = 
| occupation = Writer
| language = Italian
| ethnicity = 
| citizenship = 
| education = 
| alma_mater = University of Turin
| period = 
| genres = novels, short stories, essays
| subject = 
| movement = 
| notableworks = Family Sayings
The Advertisementsee more below| spouses = 
| children = 
| relatives = Giuseppe Levi (father)
| awards = 
| signature = 
| signature_alt = 
| years_active = 
}}

Natalia Ginzburg (14 July 1916 – 7 October 1991) was an Italian author whose work explored family relationships, politics during and after the Fascist years and World War II, and philosophy. She wrote novels, short stories and essays, for which she received the Strega Prize and Bagutta Prize.  Most of her works were also translated into English and published in the United Kingdom and United States.

An activist, for a time in the 1930s she belonged to the Italian Communist Party. In 1983, she was elected to Parliament from Rome as an independent politician.

 Early life and education 
Born in Palermo, Sicily in 1916, Ginzburg spent most of her youth in Turin with her family, as her father in 1919 took a position with the University of Turin. Her father, Giuseppe Levi, a renowned Italian histologist, was born into a Jewish Italian family, and her mother, Lidia Tanzi, was Catholic."Natalia Ginzburg, E-Notes Her parents were secular and raised Natalia, her sister Paola (who would marry Adriano Olivetti) and her three brothers as atheists.  Their home was a center of cultural life, as her parents invited intellectuals, activists and industrialists.  At age 17 in 1933, Ginzburg published her first story, I bambini, in the magazine Solaria.

 Marriage and family 

In 1938, she married Leone Ginzburg, and they had three children together, Carlo, Andrea, and Alessandra. Their son Carlo Ginzburg became a historian.

Although Natalia Ginzburg was able to live relatively free of harassment during World War II, her husband Leone was sent into internal exile because of his anti-Fascist activities, assigned from 1941–1943 to a village in Abruzzo. She and their children lived most of the time with him.

Opponents of the Fascist regime, she and her husband secretly went to Rome and edited an anti-Fascist newspaper, until Leone Ginzburg was arrested. He died in incarceration in 1944 after suffering severe torture .

In 1950, Ginzburg married again, to Gabriele Baldini, a scholar of English literature. They lived in Rome. He died in 1969.

 Career 
After her marriage, she used the name "Natalia Ginzburg" (occasionally spelled "Ginzberg") on most subsequent publications. Her first novel was published under the pseudonym "Alessandra Tornimparte" in 1942, during Fascist Italy's most anti-Semitic period, when Jews were banned from publishing.

Ginzburg spent much of the 1940s working for the publisher Einaudi in Turin in addition to her creative writing. They published some of the leading figures of postwar Italy, including Carlo Levi, Primo Levi, Cesare Pavese and Italo Calvino. Ginzburg's second novel was published in 1947.

The experiences that she and her husband had during the war altered her perception of her identification as a Jew. She thought deeply about the questions aroused by the war and the Holocaust, dealing with them in fiction and essays. She became supportive of Catholicism, arousing controversy among her circle, because she believed that Christ was a persecuted Jew. She opposed the removal of crucifixes in public buildings but her purported conversion to Catholicism is controversial and most sources still consider her an "atheist Jewess".

Beginning in 1950, when Ginzburg married again and moved to Rome, she entered the most prolific period of her literary career. During the next 20 years, she published most of the works for which she is best known. She and Baldini were deeply involved in the cultural life of the city.

In 1964 she played the role of Mary of Bethany in Pier Paolo Pasolini's The Gospel According to St. Matthew.

Ginzburg was politically involved throughout her life as an activist and polemicist. Like many prominent anti-Fascists, for a time she belonged to the Italian Communist Party. She was elected to the Italian Parliament as an Independent in 1983.

 Legacy 

In 2020, New York Review of Books issued Ginzburg's novellas, Valentino and Sagittarius, translated into English by Avril Bardoni in 1987, in a single volume.  In her new introduction for this edition, Cynthia Zarin observed that location "maps the emotional terrain" in these two works as in Ginzburg's other works: the apartment, the living room, the café where events transpire.  At a book talk to honor its debut, Zarin and the novelist Jhumpa Lahiri discussed the significance of Ginzburg's works and career.

 Honors 
1952, Veillon International Prize for Tutti i nostri ieri1963, Strega Prize for Lessico famigliare1984, Bagutta Prize for La famiglia Manzoni1991, Foreign Honorary Member of the American Academy of Arts and Sciences

 Selected works 
 Novels and short stories 
 La strada che va in città (1942). The Road to the City, transl. Frances Frenaye (1949) – first published under the name Alessandra Tornimparte
 È stato così (1947). The Dry Heart, transl. Frances Frenaye (1949)
 Tutti i nostri ieri (1952). A Light for Fools / All Our Yesterdays, transl. Angus Davidson (1985)
 Valentino (1957). Valentino, transl. Avril Bardoni (1987)
 Sagittario (1957). Sagittarius, transl. Avril Bardoni (1987)
 Le voci della sera (1961). Voices in the Evening, transl. D.M. Low (1963)
 Lessico famigliare (1963). Family Sayings, transl. D.M. Low (1963); The Things We Used to Say, transl. Judith Woolf (1977); Family Lexicon, transl. Jenny McPhee (2017)
 Caro Michele (1973). No Way, transl. Sheila Cudahy (1974); Dear Michael, transl. Sheila Cudahy (1975); Happiness, As Such, transl. Minna Zallman Proctor (2019) – adapted for the film Caro Michele (1976)
 Famiglia (1977). Family, transl. Beryl Stockman (1988)
 La famiglia Manzoni (1983). The Manzoni Family, transl. Marie Evans (1987)
 La città e la casa (1984). The City and the House, transl. Dick Davis (1986)

 Essays 
 Le piccole virtù (1962). The Little Virtues, transl. Dick Davis (1985)
 Mai devi domandarmi (1970). Never Must You Ask Me, transl. Isabel Quigly (1970) – mostly articles published in La Stampa between 1968-1979
 Vita immaginaria (1974). A Place to Live: And Other Selected Essays, transl. Lynne Sharon Schwartz (2002)
 Serena Cruz o la vera giustizia (1990). Serena Cruz, or The Meaning of True Justice, transl. Lynn Sharon Schwartz (2002)
 È difficile parlare di sé (1999). It's Hard to Talk About Yourself, transl. Louise Quirke (2003)

 Dramatic works 
 Ti ho sposato per allegria (1966). I Married You for Fun, transl. Henry Reed (1969); I Married You to Cheer Myself Up, transl. Wendell Ricketts (2008)
 Fragola e panna (1966). The Strawberry Ice, transl. Henry Reed (1973); Strawberry and Cream, transl. Wendell Ricketts (2008)
 La segretaria (1967). The Secretary, transl. Wendell Ricketts (2008)
 L'inserzione (1968). The Advertisement, transl. Henry Reed (1968) – performed at the Old Vic, London, directed by Sir Laurence Olivier and starring Joan Plowright, in 1968.
 Mai devi domandarmi (1970). Never Must You Ask Me, transl. Isabel Quigly (1973)
 La porta sbagliata (1968). The Wrong Door, transl. Wendell Ricketts (2008)
 Paese di mare (1968). A Town by the Sea, transl. Wendell Ricketts (2008)
 Dialogo (1970). Duologue, transl. Henry Reed (1977); Dialogue, transl. Wendell Ricketts (2008)
 La parrucca (1973). The Wig, transl. Henry Reed (1976); Jen Wienstein (2000); Wendell Ricketts (2008)
 L'intervista (1988). The Interview, transl. Wendell Ricketts (2008)

 References 

Further reading
 

 External links 
 Akshay Ahuja, Review of The Little Virtues, The Occasional Review'' blog
 Acobas, Patrizia, "Natalia  Ginzburg." Jewish Women: A Comprehensive Historical Encyclopedia. 1 March 2009. Jewish Women's Archive. (Viewed on July 27, 2016)

1916 births
1991 deaths
Italian anti-fascists
Politicians from Turin
Italian women dramatists and playwrights
Italian women novelists
Italian women short story writers
Strega Prize winners
Italian Communist Party politicians
20th-century Italian politicians
Levites
Fellows of the American Academy of Arts and Sciences
Writers from Turin
Jewish atheists
Italian atheists
Jewish anti-fascists
Jewish socialists
Jewish dramatists and playwrights
Jewish women writers
Jewish Italian writers
20th-century Italian women writers
20th-century Italian novelists
Communist women writers
20th-century Italian dramatists and playwrights
20th-century Italian Jews